This list of listed buildings in Frederiksberg Municipality provides a list of listed buildings in Frederiksberg Municipality, Denmark.

The list

References

External links

 Danish Agency of Culture
 Fredede ejendomme og deres sikring

 
Frederiksberg